Villasdardo is a municipality located in the province of Salamanca, Castile and León, Spain. As of 2016 the municipality had a population of 17 inhabitants.

References

Municipalities in the Province of Salamanca